Ice hockey is one of the most popular sports in the Czech Republic.

History

Ice hockey was established in the Czech Republic in 1908.

Ice hockey in the Czech Republic is governed by the Czech Ice Hockey Association. By the 1940s Czechoslovakia emerged as an ice hockey powerhouse.

Domestic League

The Czech Extraliga was first held in the 1993-94 season. It replaced Czechoslovak First Ice Hockey League after Czechoslovakia split.

The Czech Extraliga has 14 professional teams that compete in the championship. There are 52 matches are played with each team playing each other four times. In the Play-offs, the teams placed 1st - 6th qualify  for the play-offs, which will be played in best Of Seven matches. The teams placed between 7 - 10th play each other in the best-of-five matches, the other two participants compete in a  play-off quarter-final.

National team

Before the Velvet Divorce the Czech Republic national team played as the Czechoslovakia men's national ice hockey team and they had an intense hockey rivalry with the USSR.

The Czech Republic men's national ice hockey team is one of the major powers in world hockey winning Olympic gold in 1998.

The Czech Republic is a member of the so-called "Big Six" and unofficial list of major powers in world hockey.

Notable players

Jaromír Jágr is considered one of the greatest NHL players ever. He is one of many Czech ice hockey players who have had successful careers in the National Hockey League.

References